Albert George Murray (born 22 September 1942) is an English former footballer who played as a winger. He played more than 100 games in the Football League for each of his four clubs, namely Chelsea, Birmingham City, Brighton & Hove Albion and Peterborough United. He won six caps for England at under-23 level.

Murray started his career with Chelsea, and was an important figure in manager Tommy Docherty's "Diamonds" side of the mid-1960s, which won the League Cup in 1965 and narrowly missed out on FA Cup and League success. He made 183 appearances for Chelsea, scoring 44 goals.

Murray, along with several teammates, fell out with Docherty and was transferred to Birmingham City in 1966, where he linked up with ex-Chelsea teammate, Barry Bridges. He later played for Brighton & Hove Albion and Peterborough United.

He went on to run a pub in Market Deeping, south Lincolnshire.

References

1942 births
Living people
People from Hoxton
English footballers
England under-23 international footballers
Chelsea F.C. players
Birmingham City F.C. players
Brighton & Hove Albion F.C. players
Peterborough United F.C. players
English Football League players
Association football midfielders